Saleh Abazari (born 3 March 1998) is an Iranian karateka. At the 2018 Asian Karate Championships held in Amman, Jordan, he won the gold medal in the men's kumite +84 kg event. Iran also won the gold medal in the men's team kumite event.

Iran repeated this the following year in the men's team kumite event at the 2019 Asian Karate Championships held in Tashkent, Uzbekistan.

In July 2018, he won the gold medal in the men's kumite +84 kg event at the World University Karate Championships held in Kobe, Japan. He also won the silver medal in the men's team kumite event. A few months later, he was part of the Iranian team that won the gold medal in the men's team kumite event at the 2018 World Karate Championships held in Madrid, Spain.

In 2021, he won the silver medal in his event at the Asian Karate Championships held in Almaty, Kazakhstan. He also won the silver medal in the men's team kumite event.

He won one of the bronze medals in the men's kumite +84kg event at the 2022 Asian Karate Championships held in Tashkent, Uzbekistan.

Achievements

References 

Living people
1998 births
People from Arak, Iran
Iranian male karateka
21st-century Iranian people